"Dance (Our Own Party)" is a song by Maltese indie pop band the Busker. The song will represent Malta in the Eurovision Song Contest 2023 after winning Malta Eurovision Song Contest 2023, the Maltese national final for that year's Eurovision Song Contest.

Release 
The song was made available for digital download and streaming on 3 March 2023. The music video was subsequently released on the Eurovision Song Contest's official YouTube channel on 9 March 2023.

Eurovision Song Contest

At Eurovision 
According to Eurovision rules, all nations with the exceptions of the host country and the "Big Five" (France, Germany, Italy, Spain and the United Kingdom) are required to qualify from one of two semi-finals in order to compete for the final; the top ten countries from each semi-final progress to the final. The European Broadcasting Union (EBU) split up the competing countries into six different pots based on voting patterns from previous contests, with countries with favourable voting histories put into the same pot. On 31 January 2023, an allocation draw was held, which placed each country into one of the two semi-finals, and determined which half of the show they would perform in. Malta has been placed into the first semi-final, to be held on 9 May 2023, and has been scheduled to perform in the first half of the show.

Charts

References 

Eurovision songs of 2023
Eurovision songs of Malta
2023 songs
2023 singles